Hatdai is a small river town in Sainyabuli Province, Laos. It is located along the main road (Route 4, south of Phon Ngam and north of Muang Saiapoun. It contains a market. A road connects it to Ban Nata in the east.

References

Populated places in Sainyabuli Province